Margriet is a Dutch feminine given name, a form of Margaretha (Margaret). People with the name include:

 Princess Margriet of the Netherlands (born 1943), Dutch princess
 Margriet Bleijerveld (born 1958), Dutch hockey player
 Margriet Ehlen (born 1943), Dutch poet
 Margriet Hermans (born 1954), Belgian politician
 Margriet Heymans (born 1932), Dutch writer and illustrator of children's literature
 Margriet Hoenderdos (1952–2010), Dutch composer
 Margriet Kloppenburg (born 1988), Danish racing cyclist
 Margriet Matthijsse (born 1977), Dutch sailor
 Margriet de Moor (born 1941), Dutch writer
 Margriet van Noort (1587–1646), Dutch Discalced Carmelite writer
 Margriet Smulders (born 1955), Dutch photographer
 Margriet Tindemans (1951–2014), Dutch violinist
 Margriet Zegers (born 1954), Dutch hockey player

Dutch feminine given names
Given names derived from gemstones